The New York City Fire Department, officially the Fire Department of the City of New York (FDNY), is an American department of the government of New York City that provides fire protection services, technical rescue/special operations services, chemical, biological, radiological, nuclear and high-yield explosive/hazardous materials response services and emergency medical response services within the five boroughs of New York City.

The New York City Fire Department is the largest municipal fire department in both the United States, and the Western Hemisphere, and the second largest in the world after the Tokyo Fire Department. The FDNY employs approximately 10,951 uniformed firefighting employees, 4,274 uniformed EMS employees, and 2,096 civilian employees. Its regulations are compiled in title 3 of the New York City Rules. The FDNY's motto is "New York's Bravest" for fire, and "New York's Best" for EMS. The FDNY serves more than 8.5 million residents within a 302 square mile area.

The FDNY headquarters is located at 9 MetroTech Center in Downtown Brooklyn, and the FDNY Fire Academy is located on Randalls Island. The International Association of Fire Fighters (IAFF) locals are 94, 854, and 4959. EMS is represented by DC 37 Locals 2507 for EMTs and paramedics and Local 3621 for officers.

Organization

Like most fire departments of major cities in the United States, the New York City Fire Department is organized in a paramilitary fashion, and in many cases, echoes the structure of the police department. The department's executive staff is divided into two areas that include a civilian Fire Commissioner who serves as the head of the department and a Chief of Department who serves as the operational leader. The current Fire Commissioner is Laura Kavanagh, who succeeded Daniel A. Nigro in February 2022. The executive staff includes several civilian deputy commissioners who are responsible for the many administrative bureaus within the department, along with the Chief of Department, Chief of Fire Operations, Chief of EMS, Chief Fire Marshal, Chief of Training and other staff chiefs. Staff chiefs include the seven citywide tour commanders, the Chief of Fire Prevention, and the Chief of Safety.

Operationally and geographically, the department is organized into five borough commands for each of the five Boroughs of New York City. Each borough command has a borough commander. For Manhattan, this commander is an Assistant Chief, whereas each of the other four borough commanders are deputy assistant chiefs. Within those five borough commands exists nine firefighting divisions, each of which are headed by a deputy chief, who also has several deputy chiefs to help run the division when the deputy chief is not on duty. Within each division are four to seven battalions, each led by a battalion chief. The lead battalion chief for the battalion is the battalion commander and the others are battalion chiefs. Each battalion consists of three to eight firehouses and consists of approximately 180–200 firefighters and officers. Each firehouse consists of one to three fire companies. Each fire company is led by a captain, who commands three lieutenants and twelve to twenty firefighters. Tours can be either night tours (6 p.m. – 9 a.m.) or day tours (9 a.m. – 6 p.m.). Under a swapping system called “mutuals”, most firefighters combine tours and work a 24-hour shift, followed by three days off. In one tour or shift, each company is commanded by an officer (lieutenant or captain) and is made up of four to five firefighters for engine companies, five firefighters for ladder companies, rescue companies, or squad companies, and six firefighters for the hazardous materials company.

The FDNY faces highly multifaceted firefighting challenges in many ways unique to New York. In addition to responding to building types that range from wood-frame single family homes to high-rise structures, there are many secluded bridges and tunnels, the New York City Subway system, as well as large parks and wooded areas that can give rise to brush fires.

The FDNY also responds to many other incidents such as auto accidents, auto extrications, gas emergencies, entrapments, construction accidents, high-angle rescues, trench rescues, confined space incidents, explosions, transit incidents, unstable buildings or collapses, hazardous materials incidents, medical emergencies and many more.

History

1648–1865

The origins of the New York City Fire Department go back to 1648 when the first fire ordinance was adopted in what was then the Dutch settlement of New Amsterdam. Peter Stuyvesant, within one year of his arrival, appointed four fire wardens to wooden chimneys of thatched-roofed wooden houses, charging a penalty to owners whose chimneys were improperly swept. The first four fire wardens were Martin Krieger, Thomas Hall, Adrian Wyser, and George Woolsey.

Hooks, ladders and buckets were financed through the collection of fines for dirty chimneys, and a fire watch was established, consisting of eight wardens which were drawn from the male population. An organisation known as the prowlers but given the nickname the rattle watch patrolled the streets with buckets, ladders and hooks from nine in the evening until dawn looking for fires. Leather shoe buckets, 250 in all, were manufactured by local Dutch shoemakers in 1658, and these bucket brigades are regarded as the beginning of the New York Fire Department.

In 1664 New Amsterdam became an English settlement and was renamed New York. The first New York fire brigade entered service in 1731 equipped with two hand-drawn pumpers which had been transported from London, England. These two pumpers formed Engine Company 1 and Engine Company 2. These were the first fire engines to be used in the American colonies, and all able-bodied citizens were required to respond to a fire alarm and to participate in the extinguishing under the supervision of the Aldermen.

The city's first firehouse was built in 1736 in front of City Hall on Broad Street. A year later, on December 16, 1737, the colony's General Assembly created the Volunteer Fire Department of the City of New York, appointing 30 men who would remain on call in exchange for exemption from jury and militia duty. The city's first official firemen were required to be "able, discreet, and sober men who shall be known as Firemen of the City of New York, to be ready for service by night and by day and be diligent, industrious and vigilant."

Although the 1737 Act created the basis of the fire department, the actual legal entity was incorporated in the State of New York on March 20, 1798 under the name of "Fire Department, City of New York."

In 1845, the last great fire to affect Manhattan began early in the morning and was subdued that afternoon. The fire killed four firefighters, 26 civilians, and destroyed 345 buildings.

1865–1898

In 1865, the volunteer fire department was abolished by a state act which created the Metropolitan Fire District and the Metropolitan Fire Department (MFD). This effectively gave control of the fire departments in the cities of New York and Brooklyn to the Governor who appointed his Board of Commissioners. There was never any effective incorporation of the fire departments of the two cities during this period. It wasn't until the Greater City of New York was consolidated in 1898 that the two were combined under one common organization or organizational structure. The change met with a mixed reaction from the citizens, and some of the eliminated volunteers became bitter and resentful, which resulted in both political battles and street fights. The insurance companies in the city, however, finally won the battle and had the volunteers replaced with paid firefighters. The members of the paid fire department were primarily selected from the prior volunteers. All of the volunteer's apparatus, including their fire houses, were seized by the state who made use of them to form the new organization and form the basis of the current FDNY. The MFD lasted until 1870 when the Tweed Charter ended state control in the city. As a result, a new Board of Fire Commissioners was created and the original name of the Fire Department City of New York (FDNY) was reinstated.

Initially, the paid fire service only covered present day Manhattan, until the act of 1865 which united Brooklyn with Manhattan to form the Metropolitan District. The same year the fire department consisted of 13 Chief Officers and 552 Company Officers and firemen. The officers and firemen worked a continuous tour of duty, with three hours a day off for meals and one day off a month, and were paid salaries according to their rank or grade. 1865 also saw the first adoption of regulations, although they were fairly strict and straitlaced. Following several large fires in 1866 which resulted in excessive fire losses and a rise in insurance rates, the fire department was reorganized under the command of General Alexander Shaler, and with military discipline the paid department reached its full potential which resulted in a general reduction in fire losses. In 1870 the merit system of promotion in the Fire Department was established. Southwestern Westchester County (which would later become the western Bronx) was annexed by New York in 1874 and the volunteers there were phased out and replaced by the paid department. This pattern was repeated as City services expanded elsewhere.

1898–2001

On January 1, 1898 the different areas of New York were consolidated, which ushered the Fire Department into a new era. All the fire forces in the various sections were brought under the unified command of the first Commissioner in the history of the Fire Department. This same year Richmond (now Staten Island) became a part of the City of New York, but the volunteer units there remained in place until they were gradually replaced by paid units in 1915, 1928, 1932 and 1937 when only two volunteer units remained, Oceanic Hook & Ladder Vol Engine and Richmond Fire.

The unification of the Fire Department, which took place in 1898, would pave the way for many changes. In 1909 the Fire Department received its first piece of motorized fire apparatus. On March 25, 1911 a fire in the Triangle Shirtwaist Company killed 146 workers, most of whom were young female immigrants. Later the same year the fire college was formed to train new fire fighters, and on May 1, 1913 the Bureau of Fire Prevention was created.

In 1919 the Uniformed Firefighters Association was formed. Tower ladders and the SuperPumper System were introduced in 1965. Major apparatus of the SuperPumper System (the SuperPumper and the SuperTender) was phased out in 1982, in favor of the Maxi-Water Unit. But the 5 Satellite Units of the system, together with the Maxi-Water Unit (known as Satellite 6 since 1999) are still actively used as of 2007 for multiple alarm fires and certain other incidents. These are now called the Satellite Water System. Other technical advances included the introduction of high pressure water systems, the creation of a Marine fleet, adoption of vastly improved working conditions and the utilization of improved radio communications.

On November 23, 1965, incoming Mayor Lindsay announced the appointment of Robert O. Lowery as Fire Commissioner of the New York City Fire Department. His was the first commissioner level appointment announced by the Mayor-elect. Lowery, who was the first African American to serve as a Fire Commissioner of a major U.S. city, served in that position for more than 7 years until his resignation on September 29, 1973 in order to campaign for then-Controller Abraham D. Beame, the Democratic candidate for Mayor.

In 1977 the New York City Fire Department announced that women could take the exam to become firefighters. After passing the written portion of the exam, Brenda Berkman and 89 other women subsequently failed the physical portion. It was stated by an official that their physical test was “the most difficult the department had ever administered, [and] was designed more to keep women out than to accurately assess job-related skills.” After Berkman's requests for a fairer test were ignored, she filed an ultimately successful class-action lawsuit: Brenda Berkman, et al. v. The City of New York (1982). A new test was created in which standards were changed so the test was job-related and Brenda with about 40 other women passed to enter the fire academy in 1982. (See Brenda Berkman, et al. v. The City of New York, CV-79-1813, 536 F. Supp. 177 (E.D.N.Y. 1982), aff’d Berkman v. City of New York, 705 F.2d 584 (2d Cir. 1983.))

The Waldbaum's supermarket fire was a major fire on August 2, 1978 in Sheepshead Bay, Brooklyn, New York that killed six FDNY firefighters.

In 1984 and 1989, the comedy films Ghostbusters and Ghostbusters II used the Manhattan Ladder Company 8 building for the externals of the Ghostbusters' office building. On March 17, 1996, Mayor Rudolph W. Giuliani merged the emergency medical services of the NYC Health and Hospitals Corporation into the FDNY.

September 11, 2001 attacks

On September 11, 2001, American Airlines Flight 11 and United Airlines Flight 175 were hijacked by Islamic terrorists affiliated with Al Qaeda and flown into the World Trade Center's North and South Towers, respectively, causing massive damage to both towers during impact, and starting fires that caused the weakened 110-story skyscrapers to collapse within less than two hours.

FDNY fire companies and EMS crews were deployed to the World Trade Center minutes after Flight 11 struck the north tower. Chief officers set up a command center in the lobby as first arriving units entered the tower and firefighters began climbing the stairs. A mobile command center was also set up outside on Vesey Street, but was destroyed when the towers collapsed. A command post was then set up at a firehouse in Greenwich Village. The FDNY deployed 121 engine companies, 62 truck companies, 5 rescue companies, 6 squad companies, 27 Chief Officers, along with many other units to the site, with more than 1,000 firefighters, EMTs and paramedics on the scene when the towers collapsed.

Many firefighters arrived at the World Trade Center without meeting at the command centers. Problems with radio communication caused commanders to lose contact with many of the firefighters who went into the towers; those firefighters were unable to hear evacuation orders. There was practically no communication with the New York City Police Department, which had helicopters at the scene. When the towers collapsed, hundreds were trapped within and 343 fire department members along with 1 fire patrolman were killed.  The fatalities included First Deputy Commissioner William M. Feehan, Chief of Department Peter Ganci, Department Chaplain Mychal Judge, Battalion Chief Orio Palmer and Fire Marshal Ronald Bucca. Hundreds of firefighter funerals were held in the weeks to follow, including 16 in one day on Saturday, September 29, 2001.

Following the attacks, citywide fire response times that day rose by just 1 minute, to an average of 5.5 minutes. Many of the surviving firefighters continued to work alternating 24-hour shifts during the rescue and recovery effort, and they were joined by other firefighters and EMS personnel from hundreds of miles around New York City.  Among the arriving units were career and volunteer personnel from Upstate New York, Long Island, Connecticut, New Jersey, Pennsylvania, Maryland, and Florida.

2002–present

In the aftermath of the September 11, 2001 attacks, the Fire Department has rebuilt itself and continues to serve the people of New York. During the Northeast Blackout of 2003, FDNY was called on to rescue hundreds of people from stranded elevators in approximately 800 Manhattan high-rise office and apartment buildings. The entire fire department was held over from the day tour to almost double the total force to 3,401 firefighters to handle the many fires which resulted, reportedly from people using candles for light.

At the beginning of the 21st century, there were 11,400 uniformed fire officers and firefighters under the command of the Chief of Department. The New York City Fire Department also employed 2800 Emergency Medical Technicians, Paramedics and Supervisors assigned to Department's EMS Command, and 1200 civilian employees.

In 2003 Mayor Bloomberg ordered the closure of six Engine Companies, four in Brooklyn (Engine 204, Engine 209, Engine 212, Engine 278), one in Manhattan (Engine 36), and one in Queens (Engine 261).
In 2019 Lillian Bonsignore became the first openly gay and the first female chief of EMS Operations for the FDNY.

Laura Kavanagh is the current commissioner of the FDNY. She was appointed to this job by New York City mayor Eric Adams in February 2022 while a permanent replacement was being sought. Daniel A. Nigro retired on February 16, 2022 after serving as commissioner for 8 years.

Allegations of race discrimination
Over the years, the FDNY has faced and has settled numerous discrimination lawsuits alleging that the FDNY engages in a culture where hiring discrimination towards racial minorities and discrimination towards racial minorities employed by the FDNY by passing them over for raises and promotions is encouraged. Most notably in 2014, the City of New York made a $98 million discrimination lawsuit settlement for a lawsuit brought by the Vulcan Society, an African-American firefighter fraternal organization. There have also been investigations concerning FDNY firefighters engaging in bullying and harassing behavior of Muslim firefighters including behavior such as firefighters trying to slip pork products, which are prohibited under Islamic law, into the food of Muslim firefighters. In another case, the son of a former FDNY commissioner was hired as a firefighter despite allegedly making anti-Semitic comments.

Ideology and core competencies

The FDNY derives its name from the Tweed Charter which created the Fire Department of the City of New York. This is in contrast to most other fire departments in the U.S. where the name of the city precedes the words fire department.

Ideology
 The FDNY ideology of aggressive interior fire attack grew naturally out of the building and population density that characterize the city.
 The contribution of Irish and Italian Americans to the FDNY dates back to the formation of the paid fire department. During the Civil War, New York's Irish and Italian firefighters were the backbone of the 11th New York Volunteer Infantry Regiment (New York Fire Zouaves), a highly decorated unit.
 Members of the FDNY have the nickname "New York's Bravest."
 Members of the FDNY EMS have the nickname "New York's Best."
 In addition to firefighting, technical rescue, and hazardous materials mitigation, FDNY stations ambulances throughout the city, and supplies paramedics and EMTs.

Together with ambulances run by certain participating hospitals (locally known as voluntaries, not to be confused with volunteers) and private companies, it is known as the FDNY EMS Command, which is the largest pre-hospital care provider in the world, responding to over 1.5 million calls each year. All of the FDNY EMS Command members are also trained to the HAZMAT Operations level. A select group of 39 EMS units (18 BLS and 21 ALS) are known as Hazardous Material Tactical Units. Haz-Tac Ambulance members are trained to the level of Hazardous Materials Technician, which allows them to provide emergency medical care and decontamination in hazardous environments, in addition to their normal pre-hospital duties. Of these 39, eleven are also Rescue Paramedic Ambulances, whose crews are additionally trained for: Confined Space Rescue, Trench Rescue, Crush Injuries, and Building Collapse Rescues. Both the Rescue Medics and Haztac units operate with additional, exclusive protocols and specialized medical equipment.

Core competencies
A citywide Incident Management System plan released by the Office of the Mayor on May 14, 2004 set forth several "core competencies," which determine which agency has the authority to direct operations. FDNY core competencies include:
 Fire suppression
 Pre-hospital emergency medical care
 Search and rescue
 Structural evacuation
 CBRNE/HAZMAT life safety and mass decontamination
 Cause and origin, and arson investigations
 Fire prevention inspections

Training

Located centrally at the Training Academy on Randall's Island, the Bureau of Training is responsible for all firefighter training needs for the Fire Department of New York. Initial training of all firefighter candidates undergo an 18-week academy that consists of classroom education and physical fitness performance. EMS training occurs at The FDNY EMS Academy located at Fort Totten (Queens) where EMT training is 13–16 weeks and paramedic training is 9 months.

Communications

There are two Bureau of Fire Communications Dispatch Offices: Public Safety Answering Center 1 (PSAC 1) located at 11 Metrotech Center, Brooklyn, and Public Safety Answering Center 2 (PSAC 2) located at 350 Marconi Street, Bronx. PSAC 1 covers Brooklyn, Staten Island and Citywide which is part of the Joint Operation Center as of October 2020. PSAC 2 covers the Bronx, Manhattan and Queens.

An initial call to an FDNY Communications Dispatch Office is taken by the Alarm Receipt Dispatcher (ARD), who speaks with the caller in order to determine the nature of the emergency. The ARD interrogates the caller to ascertain pertinent information and processes it into the Starfire computer system, which generates an incident and provides a recommended fire department resource response based on the information provided. This information is automatically sent to the Decision Dispatcher (DD).

When the Decision Dispatcher has made a decision as to what units will actually be assigned to the incident, unless the supervisor intervenes, the dispatcher releases the incident with assigned companies. An alarm is routed to the assigned companies, both in their respective firehouses and to the individual mobile data terminals (MDT), of each company's apparatus when it is in the field, depending on where the Starfire computer shows them to be situated. If a company/unit in a firehouse does not acknowledge the run within 30 seconds, the computer will notify the Voice Alarm Dispatcher (VAD), who will call that unit via radio in their firehouse by the dedicated intercom system. One minute after the alarm is released, it will appear on the computer screen of the radio dispatcher (Radio), who will announce the alarm and the response two times, and ask for acknowledgment from any companies assigned who have not done so by radio, voice alarm, or MDT. The radio dispatcher has a special keyboard called the Status Entry Panel (SEP), which is used to update the status of units based on information received by radio.

The entire process from initial notification until a unit is dispatched can take up to two minutes, depending on the complexity of the call, the information provided by the caller(s), and the degree of other alarm activity in the office. If a dispatch office is so busy that its incoming telephone alarm lines are all occupied or not answered within 30 seconds, the call is automatically transferred to another borough dispatch office. If an Emergency Reporting System (ERS) street fire alarm box is not answered within 60 seconds, usually because all of the alarm receipt consoles are in use, the computer automatically dispatches an engine company to the location of the physical street fire alarm box.

Any communications dispatch office in the city can take a fire or emergency call by telephone for any borough, and upon completion of information taking, the incident will automatically be routed by the Starfire computer to the Decision Dispatcher (DD) for the borough in which the incident is reported.

Fire Dispatch has a minimum staffing (Staffing Level 1), which consist of one Chief Dispatcher, who supervises five Tour Supervising Dispatchers (1 in each Borough). The TSDs supervises between 4–8 Dispatchers, depending on Borough and Time/Day. The minimum staffing may be increased based on many variables, such as: an extraordinary increase in volume of incidents, a catastrophic event, in preparation of a storm, and during large events.

Alarm receipt and transmittal

There are four ways in which fires and emergencies can be reported to the New York City Fire Department: telephone alarms; fire alarm boxes; "Class 3" alarms; verbal alarms.
 Telephone alarms are the most common method of contacting the fire department. A telephone alarm is an alarm in which a civilian uses a telephone to dial one of three types of numbers: The first is 9-1-1, which is answered by New York City Police Department (NYPD) operators. The NYPD operators will then transfer the call to a fire department communications office. The second involves dialing "0" which routes the call to a telephone company operator, who then transfers the call to the fire dispatchers in the proper borough dispatch office. The third is a special seven-digit telephone number, which is published in each borough for the specific purpose of reporting fires. This number is a direct contact to a particular borough's fire department communications dispatch office.
 Fire alarm boxes are the second most common method of contacting the fire department. FDNY fire alarm boxes are located on certain street corners and in certain public buildings, such as schools and hospitals, as well as along highways, on bridges, etc. These boxes primarily consist of two types: The first is the mechanical box (also commonly called a pull-box or a telegraph box), in which a spring-wound mechanism alternately opens and closes an electrical circuit, thereby rendering a coded number linked to the specific location of the box. Until the advent of the Starfire "Computer-Assisted Dispatch System" (CADS), dispatchers had to audibly count the taps from mechanical boxes when they were received in the central offices to decipher the number of the box that was pulled. Today, a "Box Alarm Readout System" (BARS) display handles that aspect of the job; The second type is the "Emergency Reporting System" (ERS) box that is equipped with buttons to notify either the FDNY or the NYPD, allowing either department's dispatcher to have direct voice communication with the reporting party. Beginning in the 1970s, ERS boxes started to replace mechanical boxes in many areas of the city, particularly where the number of false alarms involving mechanical boxes were high. In December 1994, then-Mayor Rudolph Giuliani and then-Fire Commissioner Howard Safir began a concerted effort to remove all of the mechanical and ERS boxes throughout New York City in a cost-cutting move. Facing stiff opposition from members of the city council, community groups, dispatchers, and others, the move was blocked by court order as being discriminatory against the disabled (i.e., particularly the speech- and/or hearing-impaired) who—along with the poor—might otherwise have no dependable way to report fires and emergencies if the alarm boxes were eliminated. (In addition, unlike many other cities in the world, it was noted that 117 different languages and dialects are spoken by the residents of and visitors to the city. Since, unlike telephones, a fire alarm box requires no verbal contact to indicate its exact location, a person would not have to be able to speak—at all—or to understand English in order to alert the FDNY or NYPD to a fire or other emergency. For this reason, as well, the boxes were recognized as being vital to New Yorkers' safety.) The court order to block the removal of the boxes provided a means for people to report emergencies during the 2003 blackout, when other forms of communication were cut off. The fire alarm boxes, independent of outside power, continued to function the entire time.
 "Class 3" alarms are less common than the first two means of reporting fires. A "Class 3" alarm is one of three numerical classes of alarms given by the FDNY's Bureau of Communications to alert the fire department to automatic fire alarm systems, which are routed through commercial alarm companies. These firms monitor sprinkler systems, standpipes, smoke detectors, and internal pull-stations in non-public occupancies, such as: factories, warehouses, stores, and office buildings. When alarms are received from such accounts, these companies pass along the information to the FDNY central offices, usually by dedicated telephone circuits. The term "Class 3" was derived from the fact that the box number on such an assignment card would have a "3" preceding it, in addition to a "terminal" following it (e.g., "3-7012-4" would indicate a private alarm system in a commercial occupancy at a specific address, in the immediate vicinity of Box 7012, on the corner of Review Avenue and Laurel Hill Boulevard in Queens). In such cases, the type of alarm (e.g., sprinkler, smoke detector, interior pull-station, etc.) and an exact address—and, often, even a specific section of a building—would instantly be made available to responding units.)
 Verbal alarms are the least common means of reporting fires or emergencies, and generally involves civilians "verbally" making such reports directly to firehouses or fire companies. This can include incidents that are observed by fire units themselves when they are away from their quarters. However, "verbal" alarms may also be reported by EMS Bureau personnel, NYPD personnel, chief officers, Department officials (e.g., commissioners, medical officers, chaplains, et al.), or civilian employees of the FDNY (e.g., communications electricians, mechanics, dispatchers, etc.), who observe fires or emergencies in the course of the performance of their duties. If a fire company is available in quarters, it will immediately respond to the incident after advising the dispatchers of the same via telephone, voice alarm, or radio. If the unit is away from its firehouse (e.g., responding to or operating at another alarm, on inspection duty, etc.) at the time, the company will either stop at the new incident and operate, or the officer will request a separate assignment (as the reporting unit is unavailable to operate). Based on the information received by the dispatchers, the appropriate action (e.g., transmitting a new box, etc.) is initiated in regard to the new incident.

When a member of the public dials 911, the caller is connected to a police department operator, who assigns the call to where it needs to go based on the information provided.
 If it is police related, the information is sent to an NYPD radio dispatcher for the precinct or special unit concerned.
 If it is on a bridge or in a tunnel connected to New Jersey or at Kennedy or LaGuardia Airport, the Port Authority of New York and New Jersey is also notified.
 If it is a fire, haz-mat, or rescue incident, the 9-1-1 operator transfers the call by dedicated phone line to the appropriate FDNY communications dispatch office. (Depending on the type of incident, the NYPD may notify its own Emergency Service Units to respond instead of or along with the Fire Department.)
Fire alarm dispatchers handle comparatively few medical calls made directly to them, since the vast majority of such incidents are routed straight to the FDNY's EMS communications office by the NYPD 9-1-1 operators. However, a medical call that requires the assistance of "first-responder"-trained fire units will have said request routed electronically to the appropriate fire alarm central office, for the assignment of the proper personnel and apparatus.

Box numbers
Each address in the city is assigned a box number, based on the closest street, special building, or highway box. The term "box" refers to the Fire Alarm Boxes, which at one time lined street corners and in front of certain buildings. Each Fire Alarm Box was given a specific number by the FDNY's Bureau of Communications. Even if the physical fire alarm box is no longer at a specific address or street corner, the address or street corner is still assigned that fire alarm box's number. Box numbers can be duplicated in different boroughs, which is why they are always identified by borough name or numerical prefix on the computer (66 for Bronx and Manhattan, 77 for Brooklyn, 88 for Staten Island and 99 for Queens). If there is also a street address given to the dispatchers, the responding apparatus will get this information in the firehouse, over the air, and via their mobile data terminals in the rigs—in addition to the Box number. At present, there are about 16,000 physical fire alarm street boxes in New York City, with many additional special building boxes and highway boxes, as well as "dummy boxes" used for special response assignments. In addition there are two airport crash boxes, one in the LaGuardia Tower, (Queens Box 37), and one in the JFK Tower, (Queens Box 269), which can only be activated by the personnel in these towers. When either box is sounded, it brings an automatic second alarm (2–2) response of equipment, along with various special units.

Critical Information Dispatch System
Critical Information Dispatch System (CIDS, pronounced by the dispatcher as "Sids") data is transmitted to units in the firehouse and en route. It is information that is collected about a building during inspections and by public input, which would affect fire-fighting operations. For example:
 Warehoused apartments.
 Type and length of line stretch (or hose).
 Number of apartment units per floor.
 Unsafe conditions, standpipe conditions, and anything else the Bureau of Fire Communications or the FDNY Staff Chiefs deem important.

This information is printed on the fire ticket, and can be read by the dispatcher if requested. This information is also read automatically when a signal 10–75 (working fire) or higher signal is given, or when the supervising dispatcher deems it is important for the units to have it before arrival at an incident.

Radio and bell code signals 
The New York City Fire Department utilizes a system of ten-code radio signals, in addition to an internal one involving "bell codes" (that their origin to the days when coded telegraph signals were sent over a closed, wired system within the Department) to transmit and relay information involving both emergency communications and general, Departmental operations. There are fifty-five "10-codes" used by the Department. There are also sub-codes specific to certain "10-codes." The FDNY is currently one of the last, large fire departments in the country using "10-Codes," as opposed to "plain English," to communicate information by radio.

Fire companies

The New York City Fire Department is made up of fire companies, similar to military companies. Each fire company operates a single type of Fire apparatus, and has four shifts of firefighters and company officers. Each company responds to emergency calls from one of the city's 218 firehouses.

There are currently six different types of fire companies in the New York Fire Department, which all operate distinct types of apparatus: 197 engine companies, 143 ladder (or truck) companies, 5 rescue companies, 8 squad companies, 3 marine (or fireboat) companies, and the hazardous materials (hazmat) company. In addition to these six types of fire companies, there are numerous other specialized units that are operated by the Special Operations Command (S.O.C.), the Haz-Mat. Division, and the Marine Division. Each fire company has a specific role at the scene of an emergency.

Each type of fire company utilizes a certain type of fire apparatus, colloquially known as "rigs". Engine companies may be known as “engines” and ladder companies be known as “trucks.”

Engine companies
FDNY engine companies are tasked with fire suppression, which includes: securing a water supply from a fire hydrant, deploying handlines, then extinguishing a fire. These units respond to other emergencies as well. The apparatus of an engine is known as a pumper truck, and carries a pump (usually 1,000–2,000 gallons per minute), a water tank (usually 500 gallons), fire hoses of varying diameters (usually 1 3/4", 2 1/2", 3 1/2" and 4") in 50' lengths, emergency medical services supplies, ground extension ladders, and an assortment of basic firefighting and rescue tools. There are 197 Engine Companies in the FDNY.

Ladder companies (truck companies)
FDNY ladder companies (also known as truck companies) are tasked with forcible entry, search and rescue, ventilation, and ladder-pipe operations at the scene of a fire. They also respond to a variety of specialized emergencies. A Ladder Company can operate three types of ladder trucks: an aerial ladder truck, equipped with a 100' aerial ladder mounted at the rear of the apparatus; a tower ladder truck, equipped with either a 75' or 95' telescoping boom and bucket mounted in the center of the apparatus; and a tractor-drawn aerial ladder truck, or tiller/tractor trailer ladder truck known as a Hook and Ladder Truck, equipped with a 100' aerial ladder. A ladder company will be equipped with various forcible entry tools, ventilation equipment, and a variety of rescue tools, in addition to other tools and equipment to deal with an assortment of fires, technical rescues, and other emergencies, including motor vehicle accidents and other responses. There are 143 Ladder Companies in the FDNY.

Rescue companies
FDNY Rescue Companies are composed of specially-trained, most experienced members of the New York Fire Department. A rescue company is tasked with responding to and dealing with specialized fire and rescue incidents that are beyond the scope and duties of a standard engine company or ladder company. Rescue companies operate rescue trucks, colloquially known as "tool boxes on wheels," which carry a wide variety of specialized tools and equipment to aid in operations at technical rescue situations, such as: rope rescues, building collapse rescues, confined space rescues, trench/excavation rescues, machinery and vehicle extrication/rescues, water rescues and a variety of other technical rescue situations. They respond to all structure fires within their response district as well. There are 5 Rescue Companies in the FDNY: There are 5 new rescue company units assigned with the older rescue company apparatus being kept as reserves. Each Rescue Company also operates a Collapse Rescue vehicle. Rescues 2, 3, and 5 have their Collapse Rescue in quarters, while Rescues 1 and 4 store their Collapse Rescue at a nearby firehouse. The Jaws of Life hydraulic rescue tool systems, air bags, specialized rescue saws, specialized cutting torches, rope rescue equipment, and electric and air powered cutting, breaching and breaking equipment along with emergency medical services equipment, water rescue equipment, and other specialized equipment are among the equipment carried on the rescue company apparatus. 
 Rescue Company No. 1 serves Manhattan below 125th St. on the West Side, and below 116th St. on the East Side. Rescue 1's quarters are located at 530 W. 43rd St. in the Hell's Kitchen neighborhood of Midtown, Manhattan.
 Rescue Company No. 2 serves central and northwestern Brooklyn, not including parts of Williamsburg and Greenpoint. Rescue 2's quarters are located at 1815 Sterling Pl. in the Crown Heights neighborhood of Brooklyn.
 Rescue Company No. 3 serves the Bronx and Harlem above 125th St. on the West Side, and above 116th St. on the East Side. Rescue 3's quarters are located at 1655 Washington Ave. in the Claremont neighborhood of the Bronx.
 Rescue Company No. 4 serves Queens, and parts of northern of Brooklyn. Rescue 4 is quartered with Engine 292 at 64–18 Queens Blvd. in the Woodside neighborhood of Queens.
 Rescue Company No. 5 serves Staten Island and parts of southern Brooklyn. Rescue 5 is quartered with Engine 160, TSU 2, and the Chief of the 8th Division at 1850 Clove Rd., in the Grasmere neighborhood of Staten Island.

Squad companies
FDNY squad companies are also composed of specially trained firefighters of the New York Fire Department. Squad companies were initially established by the FDNY to serve as "manpower companies," to supplement the manpower and operations of engine companies and ladder companies. Today, squad companies can function as either engine Companies or Ladder Companies at the scene of a fire or other emergencies, but they are also equipped with the same equipment and specialized tools as the rescue companies. Some of these tools and equipment include the Jaws of Life hydraulic rescue tool systems, various specialized cutting and lifting equipment, emergency medical services equipment, rope rescue equipment and other tools and equipment. In particular, members of a squad company are highly trained in mitigating hazardous materials (hazmat) incidents, supplementing the FDNY's single hazmat company. Squad companies also operate a Freightliner M2-based medium rescue as a second piece of apparatus in response to Haz-Mat incidents, with the exception of Squad 8, which operates a HMTU Engine style rescue. There are 8 Squad Companies in the FDNY:
 Squad Company No. 1 serves northwestern, western and southern Brooklyn. Squad 1's quarters are located at 788 Union St. in the Park Slope neighborhood of Brooklyn.
 Squad Company No. 8 serves Staten Island. Squad 8 is quartered with the Staten Island Borough Commander at 3730 Victory Blvd. in the Travis neighborhood of Staten island. Staten Island was served by Squad 1 until 2018, when Engine 154 was disbanded and Squad 8 was organized in the former quarters. Before that, Staten Island was the only borough without its own squad company.
 Squad Company No. 18 serves Manhattan below 125th St. Squad 18's quarters are located at 132 W. 10th St. in the West Village neighborhood of Manhattan.
 Squad Company No. 41 serves the southwestern Bronx and Manhattan above 125th St. Squad 41's quarters are located at 330 E. 150th St. in the South Bronx neighborhood of the Bronx.
 Squad Company No. 61 serves the northeastern Bronx. Squad 61 is quartered with the Chief of the 20th Battalion at 1518 Williamsbridge Rd. in the Morris Park neighborhood of the Bronx.
 Squad Company No. 252 serves northeastern and eastern Brooklyn. Squad 252's quarters are located at 617 Central Ave. in the Bushwick neighborhood of Brooklyn.
 Squad Company No. 270 serves southern Queens. Squad 270 is quartered with the Chief of the 13th Division at 91–45 121st St. in the Richmond Hill neighborhood of Queens.
 Squad Company No. 288 serves northern Queens, Greenpoint and parts of Williamsburg. Squad 288 is quartered with Haz-Mat. 1 at 56–29 68th St. in the Maspeth neighborhood of Queens.

Hazardous materials company
The FDNY hazardous materials (hazmat) company, Haz-Mat 1 (quartered in Queens), responds to all major citywide hazardous materials incidents, building collapses, contamination-related incidents, terrorism-related disasters, major emergencies, and a variety of other incidents in which their services may be needed. Like the rescue and squad companies of the FDNY, members of Haz-Mat Company 1 are experienced and specially trained to deal with hazardous situations. The Haz-Mat company operates a Haz-Mat Truck, similar to a rescue truck, which carries a variety of equipment to deal with hazardous situations. Haz-Mat 1 also operates a smaller rescue truck which carries extra equipment not carried on the company's main piece of apparatus. The Haz-Mat company is supplemented by the squad companies primarily, the rescue companies, and four HMTU engine companies whose members are certified Haz-Mat Technicians. These four engine companies, like the squad companies, also operate medium rescue trucks that carry hazmat equipment. Plugging equipment, Hazmat personal protective equipment, non sparking tools, and other equipment are carried on the Hazardous Materials apparatus.

Apparatus manufacturers

In recent years, FDNY has used several fire apparatus manufacturers nearly exclusively. Beginning in the late 1970s, Mack and American LaFrance made most of the pumpers and ladder trucks in the FDNY fleet. In the late 1980s, Mack made only chassis and not apparatus bodies, so Ward was used for truck bodies. Mack would often work with Baker Aerialscope to create its tower ladders. Mack left the fire apparatus business in the early 1990s, and FDNY turned to Seagrave to develop its next generation of fire trucks. FDNY's very specific parameters meant that few apparatus manufacturers could compete with Seagrave for the contract.

Most of the engine companies in FDNY's fleet are Seagrave Commander II's and Seagrave Marauder II's, and include 500 gallon water tanks, and either 1,000 or 2,000 gallon per minute pumps. The 2,000 gpm pumps are primarily located in the high-rise districts, and are considered high pressure pumpers. With the loss of apparatus which occurred as a result of the September 11 attacks, FDNY began to use engines made by other companies, including Ferrara, KME, and E-One. The FDNY is making the move from a fixed cab to a "Split-Tilt" cab, so the Seagrave Marauder II Pumper will fill the FDNY's new order for 69 new pumpers. In 2014, FDNY went to KME for an order of 97 pumpers over the next few years. The new KME pumpers are high pressure pumpers and feature the split tilt cab. As of 2016? All new pumpers will be from Seagrave due to KME not finishing the contract, new Seagrave Engines have already been delivered.

Ladder companies are generally equipped with Seagrave aerials. Ladder length varies, and is dependent upon the needs of the communities to which the unit is assigned. Those in the older sections of the city often use tiller trucks to allow greater maneuverability. Before Seagrave was the predominant builder, Mack CF's built with Baker tower ladders were popular. Most FDNY aerials are built with 75’, 95', or 100' ladders. Tiller ladders, rear mount ladders, and mid-mount tower ladders are the types of trucks used. In 2010, The FDNY chose Ferrara, over Pierce and E-One, for a new contract that was issued for 10'–100' rear-mount ladder trucks, using a chassis and stainless steel cab custom-designed to FDNY specifications. Delivery of the first of these new trucks took place in the 1st quarter of 2011.

For specialty units, FDNY uses a variety of manufacturers. Its current heavy rescues, often called a "toolbox on wheels," were built by Ferrara. In 2010, a new contract was issued for five new rescue trucks, using a chassis and stainless steel cab custom-designed to FDNY specifications. As of January 2012, the new Ferrara Rescues 1–4 are in service, while the new Rescue 5 was—until it was involved in an incident, and was taken out of service for repair. Rescue 5 was returned to service in August 2013. Other specialty units, including hazardous material units, collapse trucks, and reserve rescues, are made by American LaFrance, Pierce, E-One, Freightliner, and Ferrara (HAZMAT 1). Various body types include standard heavy rescue bodies, step vans, buses, and smaller units built on GMC and Ford pick-up truck bodies.

FDNY battalion and division chiefs, in addition to EMS supervisors, operate with Chevy Silverado pick-up trucks equipped with caps and roll out trays in the bed, made by Odyssey Specialty Vehicles.  EMS division chiefs use Ford Police Interceptor Utilities.

The ambulances used by FDNY EMS are usually manufactured by Horton Ambulance, and the modules are generally mounted on Ford F-450 super duty truck chassis. When NYC EMS merged with the FDNY in 1996, ambulances had their orange stripe replaced with a red stripe, and they were manufactured by Wheeled Coach, again on Ford F-350 chassis. Some of the older ambulances were built by Southern Ambulance Builders, and mounted on Chevrolet 3500 chassis. In 2017, the FDNY EMS began using Ford F-550 Super Duty/Wheeled Coach Type I ambulances.

Fireboats (marine companies)

In addition to its Engine companies, Ladder (Truck) companies, Hazmat Company and Rescue companies, FDNY operates three Class I fireboats as marine companies year round:
 Marine Company No. 1 – Three Forty Three covering the Hudson River.
 Marine Company No. 6 – Bravest covering the East River.
 Marine Company No. 9 – Fire Fighter II covering the New York Bay.
A * Marine Battalion which responds on all Maritime incidents when available, and several seasonal (Typically from Mid-May through Early-October) Class II Marine Companies :
 'Marine Company No. 3 covering Jamaica Bay.
 Marine Company No. 4 covering Eastchester Bay.
 '''Marine Company No. 8 covering the Staten Island Shoreline.

Three older fireboats are kept in reserve: John D. McKean, Governor Alfred E. Smith, and Kevin C. Kane.
A former FDNY Marine Unit, the John J. Harvey, is notable as having returned to active service as Marine 2 on September 11, 2001, and providing firefighting services for 80 hours following the attack.

In 2010, the newly built fireboat, Three Forty Three, replaced the John D. McKean, which entered service in 1954, as Marine 1. A twin, 140-foot, vessel, Fire Fighter II, replaced Fire Fighter, dedicated in 1938, as Marine 9. The two new boats cost $60 million, funded by a grant from the Department of Homeland Security, and represented the city's first major investment in new fireboats in 50 years. The $2.4 million Bravest, commissioned on May 26, 2011, is smaller than the other two Class I boats, at 65 feet, but is able to operate in shallower waters, including those near the city's airports.

The department is also has a fleet of approximately 14 smaller, class II fireboats, with ten 33-foot Rapid Response Fire, three 31-foot medical response, and one 33-foot SCUBA boats and other equipment that can be activated for use when needed .

Volunteer departments

Nine volunteer fire companies remain in New York City and respond to calls in their neighborhood, in addition to FDNY units. They are typically in more isolated neighborhoods of the city. By borough, the volunteer companies are:
 Bronx (1) – Edgewater Park Volunteer Hose Company No. 1
 Brooklyn (1) – Gerritsen Beach Fire Volunteers Inc.
 Queens (5) – West Hamilton Beach VFD, Broad Channel VFD, Roxbury VFD, Rockaway Point VFD, and Point Breeze VFD
 Staten Island (3) – Oceanic H&L Company No. 1 , Richmond Engine Co. 1 , and Metropolitan Fire Assoc

The Staten Island volunteer companies are dispatched by the Staten Island Communications Office, and operate on the FDNY Staten Island frequency. Broad Channel and West Hamilton Beach have teleprinters in parallel with the FDNY fire companies that also serve their area. The Brooklyn and first four volunteer companies in Queens also provide ambulance services.

The nine volunteer fire departments supplement the FDNY, however their services have sometimes proven essential. They are especially needed in urgent events, such as storms that can cause flooding conditions that prevent FDNY companies from reaching alarms promptly. Typically, the departments respond in addition to the initial assignment dispatched by the FDNY. The volunteer departments are fully trained and operational with the apparatus and equipment they have. Therefore, when they arrive to a scene first or when needed, they will implement their operations alongside FDNY as applicable.

Other units

 Battalion Chief's Unit: A Battalion Chief's Unit is a command vehicle tasked with the responsibility of delivering a Battalion Chief to the fire scene. Once on the fire scene, the vehicle then takes on the role of a Command Vehicle, utilizing its radios and MDT equipment. There are 53 Battalion Chief's Units in the FDNY.
 Division Chief's Unit: A Division Chief's Unit, like a Battalion Chief's Unit, is a command vehicle tasked with the responsibility of delivering a Division Chief to the fire scene. Once on the fire scene, the vehicle then takes on the role of a Command Vehicle, utilizing its radios and MDT equipment. There are 9 Division Chief's Units in the FDNY.
 Mask Service Unit (M.S.U.): The equipment in these vehicles refills the air bottles used by firefighters to breathe in a fire.
 Recuperation and Care Unit (R.A.C.): A vehicle that is specially outfitted with equipment that will enable it to provide rehabilitation to firefighters on a fireground. Typically responds to the All Hands and Above, but more frequently responds to 2nd Alarms.
 Field Communications Unit (Field Comm.): A vehicle that is specially equipped with communication equipment, such as telephones, broadband internet, and mobile radios. Its main responsibility is to provide communication support to the on scene Incident Commander.
 Satellite Unit (Sat.U.): A special fire vehicle equipped with extra 4.5 inch large diameter hose, 6 inch diameter suction hose, foam agent and a high-volume deluge gun to support the operations of other fire units on scene. Satellite units respond as part of the second alarm response, and Staten Island first alarms.
 Tactical Support Unit (T.S.U.): A 4x4 vehicle equipped with generators and a variety of high intensity lights to aid firefighters during low light conditions. Included additional specialized equipment, such as extrication tools and a six-person Avon boat, are also carried.
 Thawing Unit: The Thawing Units are vehicles that carry a portable steam-generating boiler; its high-pressure steam is used to thaw frozen hydrants, connections, and hoselines, and used to keep equipment on the fireground, such as aerial ladders, free of ice. There is only one thawing unit per borough.
 Brush Fire Unit: A vehicle that is a four-wheel-drive, all-terrain unit that is used to reach hilly, remote, and marshy areas, in order to extinguish fires involving weeds, grass, and other vegetation. Along with regular firefighting equipment, it carries its own water, in addition to rakes, shovels, and backpack extinguishers.
 Ambulance: The New York City Fire Department staffs Emergency medical technician and Paramedic ambulances to provide emergency medical services to the city of New York. These are commonly referred to by the slang term bus.
 Haz-Tac Ambulance: The 39 EMS Units are known as the Hazardous Material Tactical Units (Haz-Tac Ambulances), and are trained to the Haz Mat Technician level. This allows them to provide emergency medical care and decontamination in hazardous environments, in addition to their normal 911 duties.
 Rescue Medic: An ALS or paramedic ambulance that is trained to the Haz Mat Technician level, and are also trained as Rescue Medical Technicians, specializing in medical care in adverse environments. The members of rescue medic units receive an extra 12% speciality pay.
 EMS Conditions Unit: A vehicle that is assigned to an Emergency Medical Service supervisor. An Emergency Medical Service supervisor oversees ambulances within their assigned area.
 Haz Tac Battalion Unit: A vehicle that is assigned to an Emergency Medical Service supervisor. This Officer is the Captain of the FDNY EMS SOC unit. The Officer is trained as a Hazmat Technician and as Rescue Technician. The unit responds to speciality assignments in order to oversee the medical management at special assignments, and the overall operation of the Haz Tac Battalion.
 Haz Tac Officer's Unit: A vehicle that is assigned to an Emergency Medical Service supervisor. This Officer is trained as a Hazmat Technician and as Rescue Technician. The unit responds to specialty assignments in order to oversee the medical management at special assignments. There are two units that cover the entire City of New York 24/7.
 EMS MERV: A vehicle that is assigned to all major medical emergencies within its borough. The Major Emergency Response Vehicle is capable of treating multiple patients at a time.
 EMS MRTU: A vehicle that is assigned to medical emergencies that have multiple patients. The Mobile Respiratory Treatment Unit is capable of providing multiple patients that require respiratory assistance.
 EMS LSU: A vehicle assigned to all medical emergencies that have multiple patients. The Logistical Support Unit carries a surplus of certain medical supplies used at MCIs.
 EMS Response Physician:' A Fire Department EMS Medical Director who is an Emergency Physician with specialized training in Hazardous Material, Technical Rescue, and other specialized prehospital skills, such as on-scene limb amputations. The Response Physician responds to major Mass Casualty Incidents, or as part of the Rescue Medical Task Force for patients requiring technical rescue or prolonged extrication. There are nine EMS response physicians throughout the city who go by the radio designation Car 5M ("5 Mary Car").

Ranks of the FDNY
Below insignia and ranks are attributed to this citation, unless specifically referenced by another source. Fire and EMS officers holding the same title wear the same insignia unless otherwise noted.

Note: In place of bugles, captains and lieutenants assigned to ladder companies are signified by axes, to rescue companies by Lyle guns, to squad companies by crossed ladders and stacked tip nozzles, and to marine companies by bugles with an anchor.

Union representation
The Department's lieutenants, captains, battalion chiefs, deputy chiefs, medical officers and supervising fire marshals are represented by the Uniformed Fire Officers Association (UFOA), Firefighters, Fire Marshals, Marine Engineers, Marine Pilots, and Marine Wipers are represented by the Uniformed Firefighters Association (UFA), and Fire Alarm Dispatchers, Supervising Fire Alarm Dispatchers, and Chief Fire Alarm Dispatchers are represented by the Uniformed Fire Alarm Dispatchers Benevolent Association—all three of which are locals of the International Association of Fire Fighters (IAFF). EMTs, Paramedics and Fire Protection Inspectors are represented by the Uniformed EMTs, Paramedics & Fire Inspectors and EMS Officers are represented by the Uniformed EMS Officers Union, both of which are locals of District Council 37.

In popular culture
Literature
The Fire Department of New York has appeared a number of times within literature. "Report from Engine Co. 82", "20,000 Alarms", and "The Last Men Out: Life on the Edge at Rescue 2 Firehouse" are three of the most famous pieces of FDNY literature.Life on The Edge at Rescue 2 Firehouse (Google Books) Accessed:5/1/2012 In addition to memorials, the FDNY has produced a number of educational materials. One of these books is the 177 page "Fire Department of New York- Forcible Entry Reference Guide- Techniques and Procedures".

Film and television
The New York City Fire Department has also appeared in numerous films and television shows. One of the earliest was the 1972 documentary Man Alive: The Bronx is Burning, for BBC Television. It was screened in the United Kingdom on September 27, 1972, and followed firefighters from a firehouse in the South Bronx: Battalion 27, Ladder 31 and Engine 82. It chronicled the appalling conditions the firefighters worked in with roughly one emergency call per hour, and the high rates of arson and malicious calls. The documentary focused heavily on firefighter Dennis Smith, who served in the South Bronx area and went on to write Report from Engine Co. 82 and a number of other books. He has become a prominent speaker on firefighting policy.

In the 1984 film Ghostbusters, Ladder Company 8's house at 14 North Moore Street in Tribeca was featured as the headquarters of the Ghostbusters. Reportedly, the firehouse was chosen because writer Dan Aykroyd knew the area and liked the building. While the firehouse served as the set for exterior scenes, the interior of the Ghostbusters base was shot in a Los Angeles studio, and in Fire Station No. 23, a decommissioned Los Angeles firehouse. Ladder 8 has the sign from Ghostbusters II mounted on the wall inside the house, and is more or less resigned to fans of the franchise stopping by to take photos of the building and asking to pose with the sign.

In 1991, FDNY firefighter Brian Hickey and his brother Raymond produced a documentary entitled Firefighters: Brothers in Battle. The film features footage of fires and rescues throughout the five boroughs of New York City, including the Happy Land Social Club fire which killed 87 persons, dramatic rescues from a crashed airplane off of La Guardia Airport, and footage and interviews at Medal Day 1991. Raymond died of cancer in 1993 and Brian was killed on 9/11 while operating at the World Trade Center. Brian last served as the Captain of Rescue Company 4 in Queens.

The 2002 documentary film 9/11 is footage of the 9/11 attacks filmed by FDNY James Hanlon, a firefighter from Ladder Co. 1, and brothers Jules and Gedeon Naudet. It follows members of Engine 7/Ladder 1 and Battalion 1 on Duane Street in Lower Manhattan. The 2005 film Brotherhood: Life in the FDNY, focuses on Squad 252 in Brooklyn, Rescue 1 in Manhattan and Rescue 4 in Queens.

The 2002 Sesame Street video Elmo Visits the Firehouse revolves around Elmo paying a visit to Engine Company 58, Ladder Company 26 of the FDNY to learn all about how firefighters do their jobs and how to "get low and go", after a fire at Hooper's Store scares him.

A 2006 PBS documentary called Taking The Heat features the struggle of women to join the FDNY, and Brenda Berkman's part in it.

Television series about FDNY have included Rescue Me, which ran from 2004 to 2011 and depicted the fictional life of firefighters in an FDNY firehouse. The NBC drama Third Watch ran from 1999 to 2005 and provided a fictionalized and dramatized depiction of the firefighters and paramedics of the FDNY and police officers of the New York City Police Department.

In 2015, the twenty-seventh season of The Amazing Race featured a tribute to the FDNY's 150th anniversary.

See also

 Collapse of the World Trade Center
 Communication during the September 11, 2001 attacks
 Great Fire of New York (1776)
 Great Fire of New York (1835)
 Great Fire of New York (1845)
 Black Sunday (NYC, FDNY) (2005)
 List of New York fire departments
 New York City Fire Department Bureau of EMS
 New York City Fire Commissioner
 New York Fire Patrol
 New York City Fire Department Rescue Company 1
 New York City Office of Administrative Trials and Hearings (OATH), for hearings conducted on certain summonses issued by FDNY
 Organization of the New York City Fire Department
 Rossville Fire of 1963
 Rescue and recovery effort after the September 11, 2001 attacks
 Waldbaum's supermarket fire a 1978 blaze that killed six firefighters.

References

References

 Boucher, Micheal L.; Urbanowicz, Gary R.; Melhan, Fred B. Jr. (2006). The Last Alarm: The History and Tradition of Supreme Sacrifice in the Fire Departments of New York M. T. Publishing, Inc., Evansville, Indiana
 Costello, Augustine E. (1887). Our Firemen: A History of the New York Fire Departments, Volunteer and Paid. New York City: Costello
 Daly, Charles P. (1871). On the Origin and History of the New York Fire Department. New York City: Unknown
 Dunshee, Kenneth H. (1939). Enjine!~Enjine! Harold Vincent Smith for the Home Insurance Company, New York City
 Dunshee, Kenneth H. (1952) As You Pass By Hastings House Publishers, New York City
  Griffiths, John L. (2007). Fire Department of New York – an Operational Reference. New York City: Griffiths.
 Urbanowicz, Gary R. (2002). Badges of the Bravest: A Pictorial History of Fire Departments in New York City''. Turner Publishing, Paducah, KY

Further reading

External links 

 
 Fire Department in the Rules of the City of New York
 FDNY objects in the Online Collections Database, Staten Island Historical Society
 Pre-1865 Fire Department Company Names and Locations

 
1898 establishments in New York City
Ambulance services in the United States
Fire departments in New York (state)
Medical and health organizations based in New York City
Shorty Award winners